Azad Peroz, known in Arabic sources as Azad Firuz, was an Iranian nobleman who served as the governor of the Sasanian province of Mazun during the reign of king (shah) Khosrow II. He was the son of a certain Gushnasp, and was given the nickname of muka'bir ("the mutilating") by the Arabs, because he cut the hands and feet of other people.

According to a tradition, a caravan of gifts sent by the Sasanian governor Vahriz to Khosrow II was attacked by the Banu Yarbu tribe. Khosrow II then ordered the governor of Mazun, Azad Peroz, to punish the tribe. In order to do that, Azad Peroz invited the Banu Yarbu tribe to the Mushakkar Castle in Hajar, where he killed everyone except the boys, who were sent in captivity to Estakhr in Pars.

During the rise of Islam, Azad Peroz converted to the religion and died during the reign of Caliph Umar.

Notes

References

Sources 
 

Generals of Khosrow II
Year of birth unknown
7th-century deaths
7th-century Iranian people
Converts to Islam from Zoroastrianism
History of Eastern Arabia
Governors of the Sasanian Empire